Igor Yuryevich Omelin (born 30 August 1995) is a Russian freestyle skier.

Carer
He competed at the 2018 Winter Olympics. and recently came second in Ski Cross World Cup. He participated in the men's ski cross.

References

1995 births
Living people
Freestyle skiers at the 2018 Winter Olympics
Freestyle skiers at the 2022 Winter Olympics
Russian male freestyle skiers
Olympic freestyle skiers of Russia
Competitors at the 2013 Winter Universiade
Competitors at the 2015 Winter Universiade
Universiade medalists in freestyle skiing
Universiade silver medalists for Russia
Universiade bronze medalists for Russia
Sportspeople from Chelyabinsk Oblast